Andrey Pisarev (born November 6, 1962 in Rostov-on-Don) is a Russian pianist combining an international concert career with teaching at the Moscow Conservatory, where he serves as a professor. His daughter Nadezda Pisareva, born in Moscow in 1987, is also a concert pianist.

External links
 Profile at ZavArte Classic Music Agency
 "El ruso Andrey Pisarev tocará el piano de Rachmaninov en Costa Rica" Terra, May 6, 2008.

Russian classical pianists
Male classical pianists
1962 births
Living people
21st-century classical pianists
21st-century Russian male musicians